Patrick Henry O'Rourk (1847–1923) was a member of the Wisconsin State Assembly and the Wisconsin State Senate.

O'Rork was born in what is now Granville, Wisconsin on August 28, 1847, as the son of Irish immigrants. In 1849, he settled with his parents in Lyndon, Sheboygan County, Wisconsin. He graduated from the University of Wisconsin Law School.

Career
O'Rourk was a member of the Assembly during the 1872 session. Later, he represented the 1st District in the Senate from 1873 to 1874. He was a Democrat. He moved to Kansas, where he became an attorney for the Union Pacific Railroad.

In 1893 he moved to Gordon, Nebraska. In 1906 he married Sarah Ellen Ashcraft (1862–1953), with whom he had one daughter, Sarah Jane. O'Rourke died in Gordon on October 6, 1923.

References

1847 births
1923 deaths
People from Granville, Wisconsin
People from Lyndon, Sheboygan County, Wisconsin
Democratic Party Wisconsin state senators
Democratic Party members of the Wisconsin State Assembly
Wisconsin lawyers
University of Wisconsin Law School alumni
19th-century American lawyers